Edith Espie (1903 – 1983) was a Western Arrernte foster mother and lay social worker in Alice Springs, Australia.

Biography 

Born at Jay Creek, near Alice Springs, Australia, Espie lived at The Bungalow, an institution for Aboriginal children. According to local historian Jay Petrick, Espie was a kind child and helped care for the other children by helping teacher and matron Ida Standley.

A jockey in her teen years, Espie rode, in colours, at the local races. Espie worked variously making pies and pasties for Snow Kenna's Walk-in Picture Show (later known as Pioneer Theatre), was the barmaid at the Stuart Arms Hotel, and did ironing for single men.

Espie had seven children with Victor Lawrence Cook, a labourer from South Australia. Espie worked as a housemaid at Huckitta Station, north-east of Alice Springs, from where one of her sons remembered leaving in 1941, aged six, to attend Hartley Street School in Alice Springs. Cook left Espie to start a "new – white – family 'down south'". Her son Bill Espie, to whom she gave birth in a tent outside the town hospital, later received a Queen's Commendation for Brave Conduct.

In addition to raising her biological children, Espie fostered several children and, according to Petrick, "had a high moral code, stressing the importance of modesty". Gloria Lee, a Chinese-American Alice Springs resident, recalled that Espie took care of her after Lee's mother died.

After suffering from cancer for years, she died on 8 March 1983 and was buried at the Garden Cemetery in Alice Springs.

Legacy 

Espie Street in Alice Springs is named for her.

References 

People from Alice Springs
1903 births
1983 deaths
Arrernte people
Members of the Stolen Generations
Australian female jockeys